The women's discus throw at the 2019 Asian Athletics Championships was held on 24 April.

Results

References

Discus
Discus throw at the Asian Athletics Championships
2019 in women's athletics